The Catholic Church in Scotland is divided into two provinces while the Catholic Church in England & Wales is divided into five.

Province of Birmingham

Province of Cardiff

Province of Glasgow

Province of Liverpool

Province of Southwark

Province of St Andrews and Edinburgh

Province of Westminster

References

Armorials of the United Kingdom
Catholic Church in England and Wales
Catholic Church in Scotland